Lorna Geddes (born 1943) is a Canadian ballerina who worked with the National Ballet of Canada for 59 years.

Early life and training 
Geddes was born in Waterloo, Ontario and began dancing at the age of three.  After training with National Ballet School of Canada co-founder Betty Oliphant, Geddes joined the National Ballet of Canada in 1959 as a member of the Corps de Ballet at the age of 16 under the Artistic Director and company founder Celia Franca. She was appointed Assistant Ballet Mistress in 1984, and became Pointe Shoe Manager in 1998. She was promoted to Principal Character Artist in 2005, and was known for her "signature role" as the Nurse in Romeo and Juliet. She retired at the end of the 2018/2019 season.

Personal life 
Geddes is married to Hazaros Surmeyan. Surmeyan joined the National Ballet of Canada in 1966, and later became Principal Character Artist in 1986. Together, they have one son, André.

Awards 
In 2008, Geddes received the inaugural David Tony Award.

References

External links 
 "When things go wrong: National Ballet dancer Lorna Geddis seems to have a case of opening night jitters but; when you consider what can go wrong; you can't blame her." Photograph by Michael Stuparyk, 1983. Toronto Star Photo Archives.
 "At the barre: Lorna Geddes; above in Coppelia; is the National Ballet's longest-performing member. Her first 25 years were spent dancing; the last three she has been a coach." Photograph by Rick Eglinton, 1987. Toronto Star Photo Archives.

1943 births
Living people
Ballerinas
+Ballerinas
Canadian ballerinas